Roberto Olabe del Arco (born 5 May 1996) is a Spanish professional footballer who plays as a left winger for Deportivo de La Coruña.

Club career
Born in Salamanca, Castile and León, Olabe represented Real Sociedad as a youth. After making his debut as a senior with the farm team in the 2014–15 season in the Tercera División, he was promoted to the reserves in June 2015.

On 4 January 2016, Olabe terminated his contract with Sanse and immediately joined Villarreal CF's C side in the fourth division. On 31 July, he moved to another reserve team, Atlético Madrid B in the same league.

Olabe made his competitive debut with Atlético Madrid on 30 November 2016, coming on as a late substitute for goalscorer Ángel Correa in a 6–0 away rout of CD Guijuelo in the round of 32 of the Copa del Rey. At the end of the campaign, he also helped the second team to promote to Segunda División B.

On 31 August 2018, Olabe was loaned to Extremadura UD of Segunda División for one year. He was a regular starter during his spell, as they easily avoided relegation.

On 7 July 2019, Olabe signed a four-year deal with La Liga's SD Eibar, but was loaned to second-tier club Albacete Balompié on 4 August. The following 22 January his loan was cut short, and he immediately moved back to Extremadura also in a temporary deal.

Olabe appeared in his first official match for Eibar on 17 December 2020, playing 90 minutes in the 2–0 win against Racing Rioja CF in the Spanish Cup. In January 2021, he was loaned to C.D. Tondela of the Portuguese Primeira Liga until 30 June.

Upon returning, Olabe was assigned to the main squad now in division two, but he made only three competitive appearances before terminating his contract on 31 January 2022. Just hours later, he agreed to a short-term deal at AD Alcorcón of the same league.

On 7 July 2022, Olabe joined Deportivo de La Coruña on a free transfer, signing a two-year contract.

International career
Olabe represented Spain at under-17 level, earning three caps.

Personal life
Olabe's father, also named Roberto, was also a footballer. A goalkeeper, he notably represented UD Salamanca before moving to coaching duties.

Honours
Atlético Madrid
UEFA Super Cup: 2018

References

External links

1996 births
Living people
Spanish people of Basque descent
Sportspeople from Salamanca
Spanish footballers
Footballers from Castile and León
Association football wingers
Segunda División players
Segunda División B players
Tercera División players
Primera Federación players
Real Sociedad C footballers
Real Sociedad B footballers
Villarreal CF C players
Atlético Madrid B players
Atlético Madrid footballers
Extremadura UD footballers
SD Eibar footballers
Albacete Balompié players
AD Alcorcón footballers
Deportivo de La Coruña players
Primeira Liga players
C.D. Tondela players
Spain youth international footballers
Spanish expatriate footballers
Expatriate footballers in Portugal
Spanish expatriate sportspeople in Portugal